Twickenham Football Club was a football club based in Hampton, England.

History
In 1945, Twickenham became founder members of the Corinthian League. After an eighth-place finish in the league's first season, Twickenham left the league. The following year, the club entered the FA Cup for the first time, losing 2–1 against Acton Town in the extra preliminary round. In 1949, Twickenham became founded members of the Metropolitan & District League, playing four seasons in the competition, before leaving in 1953. In 1953, the club joined the Parthenon League, winning the league in 1959. Twickenham remained in the Parthenon League, until its dissolution in 1966.

Ground
In the early days of the club, Twickenham played at Ivy Bridge. In 1952, Twickenham moved into The Beveree Stadium in Hampton. Twickenham vacated the ground in 1959, following Hampton's acquisition of the site's tenancy.

Records
Best FA Cup performance: Preliminary round, 1947–48, 1948–49

References

Twickenham
Sport in the London Borough of Richmond upon Thames
Corinthian League (football)
Metropolitan League
Parthenon League
Defunct football clubs in London